The 2006 CAF Super Cup was the 14th CAF Super Cup, an annual football match in Africa organized by the Confederation of African Football (CAF), between the winners of the previous season's two CAF club competitions, the African Cup of Champions Clubs and the CAF Confederation Cup.

The match took place on 24 February 2006, on Cairo Stadium in Cairo, Egypt, between Al Ahly, the 2005 CAF Champions League winner, and FAR Rabat, the 2005 CAF Confederation Cup winner.
Al-Ahly won the match by penalty shout-out 4–2 to get his second title.

Teams

Match details

References
 Al-Ahly FAR Rabat

2006
Association football penalty shoot-outs
February 2006 sports events in Africa
2006 in African football
Al Ahly SC matches
AS FAR (football)